Nassarius stolatus is a species of sea snail, a marine gastropod mollusc in the family Nassariidae, the Nassa mud snails or dog whelks.

Description
The length of the shell varies from 15 mm to 30 mm.

The ovate, conical shell is pointed at the summit . The pyramidal spire is formed of six or seven distinct, smooth, convex whorls. These are covered with very prominent, convex, longitudinal folds, intersected only at the base, and upon the two or three upper whorls, by a few pretty deep transverse striae. Upon these whorls the striae become finer and more approximate. They rarely exist upon the whole surface. In like manner the longitudinal folds do not appear upon the right portion of the body whorl. The color is of a violaceous white. A dark red zone borders the suture, and a broader and browner band surrounds also the middle of the body whorl.

Distribution
This marine species occurs off India (Ratnagiri district, Maharashtra), Sri Lanka, Indonesia and Thailand; in the Mediterranean Sea as an introduced species.

References

 Gofas, S.; Le Renard, J.; Bouchet, P. (2001). Mollusca, in: Costello, M.J. et al. (Ed.) (2001). European register of marine species: a check-list of the marine species in Europe and a bibliography of guides to their identification. Collection Patrimoines Naturels, 50: pp. 180–213

External links
 Gmelin J.F. (1791). Vermes. In: Gmelin J.F. (Ed.) Caroli a Linnaei Systema Naturae per Regna Tria Naturae, Ed. 13. Tome 1(6). G.E. Beer, Lipsiae
 Röding, P.F. (1798). Museum Boltenianum sive Catalogus cimeliorum e tribus regnis naturæ quæ olim collegerat Joa. Fried Bolten, M. D. p. d. per XL. annos proto physicus Hamburgensis. Pars secunda continens Conchylia sive Testacea univalvia, bivalvia & multivalvia. Trapp, Hamburg. viii, 199 pp
 Mörch, O. A. L. (1852-1853). Catalogus conchyliorum quae reliquit D. Alphonso d'Aguirra & Gadea Comes de Yoldi, Regis Daniae Cubiculariorum Princeps, Ordinis Dannebrogici in Prima Classe & Ordinis Caroli Tertii Eques. Fasc. 1, Cephalophora, 170 pp. (1852); Fasc. 2, Acephala, Annulata, Cirripedia, Echinodermata, 74 (+2) pp. (1853). Hafniae
 Katsanevakis, S.; Bogucarskis, K.; Gatto, F.; Vandekerkhove, J.; Deriu, I.; Cardoso A.S. (2012). Building the European Alien Species Information Network (EASIN): a novel approach for the exploration of distributed alien species data. BioInvasions Records. 1: 235-245
 Cernohorsky W. O. (1984). Systematics of the family Nassariidae (Mollusca: Gastropoda). Bulletin of the Auckland Institute and Museum 14: 1–356
  Zenetos, A.; Gofas, S.; Verlaque, M.; Cinar, M.; Garcia Raso, J.; Bianchi, C.; Morri, C.; Azzurro, E.; Bilecenoglu, M.; Froglia, C.; Siokou, I.; Violanti, D.; Sfriso, A.; San Martin, G.; Giangrande, A.; Katagan, T.; Ballesteros, E.; Ramos-Espla, A.; Mastrototaro, F.; Ocana, O.; Zingone, A.; Gambi, M.; Streftaris, N. (2010). Alien species in the Mediterranean Sea by 2010. A contribution to the application of European Union's Marine Strategy Framework Directive (MSFD). Part I. Spatial distribution. Mediterranean Marine Science. 11(2): 381-493
 Zenetos, A.; Meriç, E.; Verlaque, M.; Galli, P.; Boudouresque, C.-F.; Giangrande, A.; Cinar, M.; Bilecenoglu, M. (2008). Additions to the annotated list of marine alien biota in the Mediterranean with special emphasis on Foraminifera and Parasites. Mediterranean Marine Science. 9(1): 119-165
 

Nassariidae
Gastropods described in 1791